Benedikt Dorsch and Björn Phau were the defending champions, but they chose not to participate this year.
Prakash Amritraj and Rajeev Ram won in the final 6–3, 4–6, [10–8] against Patrick Briaud and Jason Marshall.

Seeds 

  Prakash Amritraj /  Rajeev Ram (champions)
  Todd Widom /  Michael Yani (first round)
  Brian Battistone /  Dann Battistone (quarterfinals)
  Hiroki Kondo /  Ashutosh Singh (semifinals)

Draw

Draw

External links
 Main Doubles Draw
 Qualifying Draw

Challenger of Dallas - Doubles
2009 Doubles